Jaakko Nyberg (born 19 December 1980) is a retired Finnish football defender.

Career 
He joined the team Bryne FK from Kongsvinger IL in 2006, and has also played for Kemin PS, KPT-85 and top-flight team VPS Vaasa in his home country. Nyberg left Bryne FK on 20 February 2009 and moved to Turun Palloseura.

References 

Club bio

External links
 

Finnish footballers
1980 births
Living people
People from Kemi
Veikkausliiga players
Kongsvinger IL Toppfotball players
Bryne FK players
Finnish expatriate sportspeople in Norway
Expatriate footballers in Norway
Association football defenders
Sportspeople from Lapland (Finland)